Boone was an unincorporated community in Fayette County, West Virginia, United States.

The community has the name of Francis Boone, a businessman in the mining industry.

References 

Unincorporated communities in West Virginia
Unincorporated communities in Fayette County, West Virginia
Coal towns in West Virginia